Cady Danyl Groves (July 30, 1989 – May 2, 2020) was an American pop and country singer from Emporia, Kansas. Some of her notable songs include "One in the Same", "This Little Girl", "Oh Darling", "Forget You", and "Love Actually". She released four EPs during her lifetime: A Month of Sundays (2009), The Life of a Pirate (2010), This Little Girl (2012), and Dreams (2015). A fifth EP, Bless My Heart, was released shortly after her death.

Early life 
Groves was born on July 30, 1989, to Carol Pettit and Larry Groves, and was the youngest of seven children. Her siblings were Kevan, Casey (died 2007), Cody, Kyle, Kelly (died 2014), and Kelsy, along with three half-siblings, Adam Groves, Courtney Farmwald and Carrie Groves. She lived in Emporia, Kansas until her parents divorced, and then the family moved to Marlow, Oklahoma. She later moved to Cache, Oklahoma, before relocating to Valley Center, Kansas. She moved to Laughlin, Nevada, in 2005, where she graduated high school at sixteen. Cady wanted to pursue a career in songwriting, but her family encouraged her to obtain higher education, so she attended and graduated from the Culinary Arts program at Mohave Community College in Bullhead City, Arizona. In 2007, she left Nevada for Weatherford, Oklahoma, where she attended Southwestern Oklahoma State University.

Career 

Groves released her first EP, A Month of Sundays, in 2009. Her second, The Life of a Pirate, followed in 2010. That year, Groves signed with RCA Records and toured with Third Eye Blind, Good Charlotte, and All Time Low. Groves eventually left RCA and signed with New York–based independent label Vel Records. In 2015, Groves returned with a self-released single, "Crying Game", which was inspired by her tumultuous childhood and strained family relationships. She then embarked on her High School Nation Tour, where she performed for over 50,000 high school students.

Collaboration 
RCA paired Groves with several producers and songwriters (including Savan Kotecha, Carl Falk, and Kristian Lundin) as she began work on her first major-label album. She collaborated with Stephen Jerzak on "Better Than Better Could Ever Be" and collaborated with Plug in Stereo on "Oh Darling", which spent five weeks on the Billboard Rock Digital Songs Chart and peaked at #36. In 2011, Groves was featured on the single "You and I" by Secondhand Serenade and "All That I Need Is You" by Andrew de Torres. In 2015, a collaboration with Christian Burghardt took place, which led to the track "Whiskey and Wine."

Death 
Groves died on May 2, 2020, at the age of 30. Her brother Cody stated that her death was due to unspecified natural causes and that self-harm and foul play were ruled out. On August 8, 2020, Fox News reported that an autopsy report stated that she died of complications from alcohol abuse. According to Ryan Williams, who was a friend of Groves, she was deeply affected by the premature deaths of her brothers Casey and Kelly, saying to Fox News: "Her dad wasn't really around anymore and music was really tough on her as well ... She had so many tragic things happen to her in her life. There was always someone's birthday that wasn't around anymore, like her brothers. There was always kind of like a dark shadow around her."

Her fifth EP, Bless My Heart, was released posthumously on May 29.

Prophetically, in February 2012, Groves uploaded a live cover of The Band Perry's "If I Die Young" to SoundCloud. The lyrics in the song lament the bittersweet tragedy that many writers and artists only become popular after death.

Discography

EPs 
 A Month of Sundays (2009)
 The Life of a Pirate (2010)
 This Little Girl (2012)
 Dreams (2015)
 Bless My Heart (2020)

Singles 
 "One In The Same" (2010)
 "This Little Girl" (2011)
 "Love Actually" (2012)
 "Forget You" (2013)
 "Whiskey & Wine" with Christian Burghardt (2015)
 "Crying Game" (2015)
 "Dreams" (2015)
 "Oil And Water" (2015)

Compilation appearances 
 Rockin' Romance 2 – (God Must Have Spent) A Little More Time on You ('N Sync cover)

Tours 
 Bamboozle Road Show 2010 (2010)
 Let's Be Animals Tour 2011 (2011)
 Beautiful Freaks Tour (2012)
 High School Nation Tour (2015)

References

External links 

 
 

1989 births
2020 deaths
21st-century American women singers
American country singer-songwriters
American women country singers
American women pop singers
American women singer-songwriters
American pop rock singers
Country musicians from Oklahoma
People from Marlow, Oklahoma
People from Emporia, Kansas
Singer-songwriters from Oklahoma
21st-century American singers
Singer-songwriters from Kansas